General Artemas Ward is a bronze statue of American Revolutionary War general Artemas Ward by Leonard Crunelle at Ward Circle, at the intersection of Nebraska and Massachusetts Avenues in Northwest, Washington, D.C.

The circle is centered around a  bronze statue of Artemas Ward. Ward was the first Commander-in-Chief in the American Revolutionary War. Congress authorized the statue by 45 Stat. 689. Sculptor Leonard Crunelle created the statue over a three-year period, while the base and pedistal were built by J. F. Manning Co. The pedistal was made from granite from Stony Creek, Connecticut. The president and fellows of Harvard College donated the $50,000 to cover the cost of the statue. The donation fulfilled the terms of the will of Artemus Ward, an alumnus of Harvard and the great-grandson of Maj. Gen. Artemus Ward. The statue was unveiled on November 3, 1938, by Mrs. Wesley Feick, the great-great-granddaughter of Maj. Gen. Ward. Secretary of War Harry Hines Woodring spoke at the unveiling. The circle itself was constructed for displaying the sculpture.

The figure of Ward is wearing a Revolutionary War general's uniform, there is a hat and gloves in his left hand, and there is a trench mortar at his feet.

The base of the statue bears this inscription:

As part of American Revolution Statuary in Washington, D.C. the statue is listed on the National Register of Historic Places.

See also 
 List of public art in Washington, D.C., Ward 2

References

External links 
 
 Artemas Ward Statue, DC
 Artemas Ward Statue (in District of Columbia Neighborhood, DC)
 WARD, Artemas: Memorial at Ward Circle in Washington, D.C.

1936 sculptures
Ward
Bronze sculptures in Washington, D.C.
Historic district contributing properties in Washington, D.C.
American University Park